Aylesford East, Nova Scotia  is a community in Kings County, Nova Scotia, Canada. It is near the Annapolis River and is served by  Nova Scotia Trunk 1.

References

Communities in Kings County, Nova Scotia